Pride is the seventh studio album by English singer Robert Palmer, released in April 1983 by Island Records. The album peaked at No. 37 in the UK Albums Chart. The album also peaked at No. 12 in France, No. 15 in the Netherlands and No. 36 in Sweden.

Critical reception
In a contemporaneous review, The Globe and Mail found that Palmer "has created a synthesis of English mainstream pop and heavy black rhythms, utilizing various combinations of more roots-oriented West Indian music such as calypso and soca, the almost-tribal rhythms of such African musicians as King Sunny Ade, and to a lesser degree, the more familiar patterns of urban American funk." A retrospective review concluded that "[the] suave British musician's 1983 project added a new, contemporary funk edge to his musical palette", and noted that the album, "once again self-produced, showed a typically eclectic range of styles". Another reviewer found that "The Silver Gun”, which is sung in Urdu, is "a very haunting and bizarre track, which displays the incredible versatility of Robert Palmer’s voice."

2011 reissue
Pride was reissued in 2011 by Culture Factory USA, an independent label that specialises in cult artists. The reissue CD was packaged in a miniature replica of the original vinyl packaging, has replica of the original Island label, and is black so as to resemble vinyl. It was limited to 3,000 copies and did not have any additional outtakes or bonus tracks.

Track listing
All songs written and composed by Robert Palmer, except where noted.

Personnel 
 Robert Palmer – vocals, keyboards, guitar, arrangements
 Rupert Hine – keyboards
 Alan Mansfield –  keyboards, guitar
 Jack Waldman – keyboards
 David Frank – keyboards (track 5)
 Frank Blair – bass guitar
 Bill Bonaparte – drums
 Michael Dawe – drums
 Dony Wynn – drums

Production
Producer – Robert Palmer
Executive Producer – David Harper
Engineers – Jack Nuber, Paul Jarvis (track 5)
Mixed by Dominique Blanc-Francard at Continental Studio (Paris, France); Jack Nuber at Soundworks (New York, NY).
Mastered at Translab (Paris, France).
Technicians – Paul Jarvis and Kendall Stubbs
Cover Painting – Bert Kitchen

Charts

See also
 List of albums released in 1983

References

External links

Robert Palmer (singer) albums
1983 albums
Island Records albums
Albums produced by Robert Palmer (singer)